The Faringdon branch was a -mile-long branch line from Uffington Station to Faringdon in the Vale of White Horse, in Oxfordshire.

History

Opening
The line was opened in 1864, between Faringdon and the Great Western Railway (GWR) at Uffington, with construction funded by a consortium of local businessmen called the Faringdon Railway Company, which was bought outright by the GWR in 1886.  

The line was inspected on 13 April 1864 by Capt. F. H. Rich R.E., who found numerous faults that prevented the line's opening, including weak bridges. Rich re-inspected the line on 13 May and passed the line for opening, which was done on 1 June 1864.

Gauge conversion
Constructed as a broad gauge line, it was converted to standard gauge in 1878.

Decline and closure
Passenger traffic peaked in 1913, but later declined to such an extent that the passenger service was withdrawn in 1951. Freight traffic continued to use the line until the Beeching cuts of 1964.

Reopening proposal
Faringdon Town Council proposed in 2005 to reopen the line, but it remains closed.

References

External links
A brief history of the line with pictures

Rail transport in Oxfordshire
Railway lines opened in 1864
Railway companies disestablished in 1886
Closed railway lines in South East England